Peoria is an unincorporated community in Liberty Township, Union County, Ohio, United States.

A post office was established in Peoria on September 26, 1872; it was closed on August 11, 1967. The mail service is now sent through the Columbus regional mail sorting facility, and distributed through the Marysville and Raymond local post offices.

Origins 

The town was originally platted by Joseph K. Richey in 1870. His original plat included 28 "town lots" most of which were 66' by 165' in size (in the parlance of the day, 4 poles wide and 10 poles deep), 1/4 acre per lot. The town was established at the junction of the newly built Marysville-Newton Road (Raymond was then called Newton) and the Atlantic and Great Western Railroad. By the early 1880s, the Ohio Central Railroad (which became the Toledo and Ohio Central Railway) had built a northwest-southeast line that crossed the southwest-northeast A&GW line. The Peoria railroad station, situated at the grade crossing of the two rail lines, was the only depot in Liberty Township that could accommodate both freight and passengers. The station also featured a water tank and a coaling tower to service the steam engines of the time. Remnants of the foundations of these structures are still visible today.

Largely because of the railroad station and the post office established there in 1872, Peoria quickly became a commercial center, featuring stores, churches, warehouses, hotels, small businesses—including a barber shop and a mill—and a public school. The population of the village was estimated at 150 in 1910.

Peoria today 

The commercial enterprises of the past in Peoria no longer exist. The school and the churches are also gone. With the closing of the post office in 1967, the community became primarily residential, with commerce flowing to nearby Raymond and Marysville. Population today is estimated to be roughly the same as in 1910—around 150.

References 

Unincorporated communities in Union County, Ohio
Unincorporated communities in Ohio